"Là c'est die" is a song by Ridsa from the album Tranquille.

Charts

References 

2015 singles
French-language songs
2015 songs